Robert J. Tracy is an American law enforcement officer who was appointed as the 36th Police Commissioner of the St. Louis Metropolitan Police Department on December 14, 2022, at a salary of $270,000 a year.

As Commissioner of Police Tracy is responsible for planning, directing, managing and overseeing the activities and operations of the Metropolitan Police Department, including field operations, investigations, support services, and general administration. He also coordinates activities with other city departments and outside agencies. He oversees a department of 1,000 officers and 400 civilian employees with a yearly budget of $270 million.

References

American law enforcement officials
American police officers
Year of birth missing (living people)
Living people
Commissioners of the St. Louis Metropolitan Police Department